A string bog or string mire is a bog consisting of slightly elevated ridges and islands, with woody plants, alternating with flat, wet sedge mat areas. String bogs occur on slightly sloping surfaces, with the ridges at right angles to the direction of water flow. They are an example of patterned vegetation.  

String bogs are also known as aapa moors or aapa mires (from Finnish aapasuo) or Strangmoor (from the German). 

A string bog has a pattern of narrow (2–3m wide), low (less than 1m high) ridges oriented at right angles to the direction of drainage with wet depressions or pools occurring between the ridges. The water and peat are very low in nutrients because the water has been derived from other ombrotrophic wetlands, which receive all of their water and nutrients from precipitation, rather than from streams or springs. The peat thickness is greater than 1m.

String bogs are features associated with periglacial climates, where the temperature results in long periods of subzero temperatures. The active layer exists as frozen ground for long periods and melts in the spring thaw. Slow melting results in characteristic mass movement processes and features  associated with specific periglacial environments.

See also

 Blanket bog
 Flark
 Marsh

References

 Canadian Soil Information Service - Local Surface Forms (checked 2014-10-18)
 
 

 String bog
Ecology

de:Regenmoor#Aapamoore